Oppositionist could mean:
Ministerialists and Oppositionists (Western Australia)
A member of various opposition parties